Mount Edison is an  elevation glaciated summit located  northwest of Valdez in the Chugach Mountains of the U.S. state of Alaska. It is part of the Dora Keen Range, which is a 25-miles-long divide separating Harvard Glacier from Yale Glacier. The mountain was named by members of the Chugach Mountains Expedition in 1955, and later officially adopted by the U.S. Board on Geographic Names to honor Thomas Edison (1847–1931), who has been described as America's greatest inventor.

Climate

Based on the Köppen climate classification, Mount Edison is located in a subarctic climate zone with long, cold, snowy winters, and cool summers. Weather systems coming off the Gulf of Alaska are forced upwards by the Chugach Mountains (orographic lift), causing heavy precipitation in the form of rainfall and snowfall. Temperatures can drop below −20 °C with wind chill factors below −30 °C. This climate supports the Harvard, Yale, and Columbia Glaciers surrounding this mountain. The months May through June offer the most favorable weather for climbing.

See also

List of mountain peaks of Alaska
Geography of Alaska

References

Gallery

External links
 Weather: Mount Edison

Edison
Edison
Edison